Bijar Posht (also Romanized as Bījār Posht) is a village in Malfejan Rural District, in the Central District of Siahkal County, Gilan Province, Iran. At the 2006 census, its population was 73, in 19 families.

References 

Populated places in Siahkal County